Falcone Borsellino Airport  or simply Palermo Airport, formerly Punta Raisi Airport, is an international airport located at Cinisi,  west northwest of Palermo, the capital city of the Italian island of Sicily. It is the second airport of Sicily in terms of passengers after Catania-Fontanarossa Airport, with 7,018,087 passengers handled in 2019.

History

Early years

GESAP S.p.a. is the airport management company of the airport. It has a fully paid-up share capital of €15,912,332 divided between the Regional Province of Palermo, the Comune of Palermo, the Chamber of Commerce, the Comune of Cinisi and other minor partners.

Established in 1985, until 1994 GESAP operated exclusively as handler and supplier of ground services for Palermo Airport, the management of which is directly assigned by the government and overseen by the District Airport Directorate.

The airport was given the name Falcone Borsellino in memory of the two leading anti-mafia judges Giovanni Falcone and Paolo Borsellino who were murdered by the Sicilian Mafia in 1992. A  diameter plaque featuring their portraits can be found to the right of one of the main outside entrances to the departure hall, set into a mosaic of Sicily. Created by the Sicilian sculptor Tommaso Geraci, it bears the inscription Giovanni Falcone–Paolo Borsellino–Gli Altri–L'orgoglio della Nuova Sicilia (Giovanni Falcone–Paolo Borsellino–The Others–The Pride of the New Sicily).

In 1994, GESAP was charged with the partial management of the airport through a convention which granted the company a 20-year mandate to run land-side activities (the airport buildings and surrounding areas).

In April 1999, GESAP obtained an anticipated mandate to manage the airport's air side activities, and, more specifically, the flight infrastructure (runways, links, taxiways and aprons) as foreseen by art. 17 L. 135/97.

As airport management company, GESAP plans, creates and manages the airport's areas, infrastructures and systems, ensuring the necessary maintenance and implementation of the same. It also provides centralised services such as airport coordination, public information systems, security controls and surveillance as well as managing commercial outlets through concessions to third parties.

Development since the 2000s
In April 2004, GESAP was awarded UNI ISO 9001/2000 (Vision 2000) certification. The company had already received certification for its services and processes in the handling sector and this too was renewed by the certification body, TÜV, in December 2006.

On 30 May 2004, ENAC awarded GESAP an "airport certificate" in recognition of the airport's full conformity with the regulations set down in ENAC's "regulations for the construction and management of airports". On 24 May 2007 GESAP has obtained the renewal of the airport certificate until 30 May 2010.

Today, after having recently transferred its handling sector to a controlled company, GH Palermo, GESAP is awaiting a ministerial decree that will grant it a forty-year concession for the total management of the airport. This comes after the deliberation of ENAC's board of directors on 1 March 2005 that was officialised in a convention signed on 17 November 2006.

In June 2005, Eurofly launched seasonal flights from Palermo to New York City using Airbus A330s. The company later merged with Meridiana to create Meridiana Fly, which continued to operate the transatlantic service. However, as a result of the airline's decision to rebrand as Air Italy, the route ended in October 2017.

Airlines and destinations
The following airlines operate regular scheduled and charter flights at Palermo Airport:

Statistics

Accidents and incidents
 On 5 May 1972, Alitalia Flight 112 flew into Mt. Longa on approach to Palermo Airport. All 115 aboard were killed. 
 On 23 December 1978, Alitalia Flight 4128 crashed into the Tyrrhenian Sea while on approach to Palermo Airport. 
 On 6 August 2005, Tuninter Flight 1153, an ATR 72–500, ran out of fuel while en route and ditched about 18 miles from the city of Palermo. 16 of the 39 people on board died.
 On 24 September 2010, Wind Jet Flight 243, operated by Airbus A319-132 EI-EDM, landed short of the runway after encountering a thunderstorm and windshear on approach. The aircraft was substantially damaged when it impacted the localiser. Both main undercarriage sets collapsed and the aircraft was evacuated by the emergency slides. Around 20 passengers were injured in the evacuation.

Ground transport

Train
The airport's railway facility, Punta Raisi railway station, is the northwestern terminus of Palermo metropolitan railway service. It links the airport with Palermo Centrale railway station. A typical timetable on work days is a train every 30 minutes in each direction between early morning and around 10.00 pm.

Bus
There are several private bus companies, which stop at the bus station outside the terminal building and connect the airport with nearby Palermo city. There are further connections to/from Palermo, Catania, Messina and rest of Sicily.

See also 
 Catania Fontanarossa Airport Vincenzo Bellini – Sicily's major international airport
 Trapani Birgi Airport Vincenzo Florio – another of Sicily's international airports
 Comiso Airport Vincenzo Magliocco – another of Sicily's international airports
 List of airports in Italy

References

External links

Official website

Airport, Punta Raisi
Airports in Sicily
Province of Palermo